Chuck Templeton is an American Internet entrepreneur, best known as the founder and former CEO of OpenTable, which went public in May 2009 and was acquired by The Priceline Group in June 2014.  He is currently a Managing Director of S2G Ventures (Seed to Growth), an investment fund focused on healthy food and sustainable agriculture, Investment Committee Member at Impact Engine, a Chicago-based social and environmental impact investment fund, and serves on the boards of several other Internet start-ups.

Education and early life 

Originally from Lafayette, California, Templeton started his career as a United States Army Ranger.  He holds a Bachelor of Science in Environmental Economics from California Polytechnic State University and a Master of Business Administration (Class of 2006) from Northwestern University’s Kellogg School of Management.

Career

OpenTable

The idea for OpenTable developed in 1998 when Templeton’s in-laws came to town for a visit. Templeton's father-in-law is Lettuce Entertain You founding partner Bob Wattel, and the dining selections for the Wattels' visit were so important that Templeton recalled his wife spending 3 1/2 hours on the phone trying to secure reservations.

GrubHub

Templeton was the founding Chairman and served as an advisor for GrubHub, now GrubHub Seamless, which went public in April of 2014.

OhSoWe.com

In 2004, Templeton co-founded OhSoWe.com, a site that allowed neighbors to trade or rent items like tools or sporting equipment among each other.

Getable
Former Board Member of Getable, Inc. which simplifies the process of renting construction equipment.

Impact Engine

Templeton is an Investment Committee Member at Impact Engine, a venture capital and private equity firm investing in companies driving positive impact in economic empowerment, education, environmental sustainability, and health.

Juhl Energy, Inc.

Templeton has been a board member of Juhl Energy, Inc. since April 9, 2014.  The company services a wide variety of wind projects and renewable energy developments.

Piece & Co., Inc.
Former Board Member of Piece & Co., Inc., which promoted sustainable employment for women in developing countries through the sale of handmade fabrics to high end designers.

ThinkCERCA, Inc.
Former Board Member of ThinkCERCA, Inc., a literacy and critical thinking software company.

S2G Ventures
In 2015, Templeton co-founded and currently (as of January 2016) serves as co-Managing Director of the S2G Ventures (Seed to Growth) venture fund.  The fund focuses on “soil to shelf” businesses within food and agriculture, including companies that deliver locally produced, nutritious, organic foods.

Honors and recognition 

 Crain’s Tech 50 2015
 Built In Chicago startup hub's Moxie Mentor of the Year 2014
2014 Hall of Fame Inductee - Distinguished Restaurants of North America
 Crain’s Tech 50 2013
 Moxie Mentor of the Year 2013
 Crain’s Tech 50 2012
 The Executives Club of Chicago Innovation Award to Impact Engine 2013
 2011 Alumni Entrepreneur Innovator Award from the Larry and Carol Levy Institute for Entrepreneurial Practice

Personal life 

Templeton is married to Julie Templeton and together they have two daughters Kendall and Josie Templeton.  Templeton is committed to preventing climate change, and is an avid runner.

References

External links 

Living people
1968 births
California Polytechnic State University alumni
Kellogg School of Management alumni
American technology chief executives
Businesspeople from California
People from Lafayette, California